Merocroca automima is a moth of the family Oecophoridae. It is found in Australia.

Oecophoridae